Pass, PASS, The Pass or Passed may refer to:

Places 

Pass, County Meath, a townland in Ireland
Pass, Poland, a village in Poland
Pass, an alternate term for a number of straits: see List of straits
Mountain pass, a lower place in a mountain range allowing easier passage

Permissions
Pass (military), permission for military personnel to be away from their unit 
Backstage pass, allows admission to backstage areas of a performance venue
Press pass, grants special privilege or access to journalists
Season ticket, or season pass
Ticket (admission), also called a pass
Transit pass, permitting travel, including:
Boarding pass, allows a passenger to board an aircraft
Continent pass, a pass allowing air travel within a continent

People
A Pass (born 1987), Ugandan musician
Frank Alexander de Pass, English soldier, first Jewish recipient of the Victoria Cross in World War I
Joe Pass (1929–1994), American jazz musician
John Pass (engraver) (c.1783–1832), English engraver
John Pass (poet) (born 1947), British-born Canadian poet
Nelson Pass (born 1951), American designer of audio amplifiers
Patrick Pass (born 1977), American football player

Arts, entertainment, and media
 Battle pass, a type of monetization and reward system in video games
 Pass (cards), to make no bid when it is one's turn to do so
 A type of card manipulation in close-up magic
 Passed (band), a Hungarian band formed in the summer of 2014
 "The Pass" (song), a song by the band Rush, from their 1989 album Presto
 The Pass (1988 film), a Soviet animated short film
 The Pass (2016 film), a film by Ben A. Williams based on the play by John Donnelly about football and homosexuality
 Pro-Am Sports System, or PASS Sports, a former Detroit-area cable television channel

Businesses and organizations
The Pass Casino in Henderson, Nevada, United States
Pass Labs, an audio company based in Foresthill, California, United States
Professional Association for SQL Server, a global Microsoft SQL Server community group
Professional Aviation Safety Specialists, an AFL–CIO affiliated union

Education
 Pass, a term used in grading to indicate a student has successfully completed academic requirements
 Peer-Assisted Study Sessions, an academic support program often used in higher education

Law and government
Pass (legislature), the action of approving a proposed law
Pass laws, apartheid laws in South Africa which limited the movement of some people
Pass Plus, a UK scheme to improve driving skills among young drivers
Palmetto Assessment of State Standards (PASS), a standardized test taken in South Carolina, USA
Proof of Age Standards Scheme (PASS), an age identification program in the UK

Science and technology

Computing
Pass (software), a command line based password manager for Unix systems
PASS Sample Size Software, a computer program for estimating sample size
Planning, Attention, Simultaneous, and Successive Theory, a learning and intelligence model
Platform as a service, usually spelled PaaS, a category of cloud computing services

Other uses in science and technology
Pass (spaceflight), the period in which a satellite or other spacecraft is visible above the local horizon
PASS device, a personal safety device used by firefighters entering a hazardous environment 
Plasma Acoustic Shield System, a disorientating weapon based on plasma explosions
The Pass (psychoanalysis), a procedure

Sport

Pass (ice hockey), the movement of the puck from one player to another
Basketball pass
Forward pass, in American and Canadian football
Lateral pass or onside pass, in American and Canadian football respectively
Passing (association football)
Pro All Stars Series, a super late model racing series
Rugby passes (disambiguation)
"The Pass", nickname for the 1996 CART Monterey Grand Prix

Other uses
Pass (sleight of hand), a sleight of hand move
Performer Availability Screening Services, a U.S. STI screening database

See also
 
 Bypass (disambiguation)
 Passage (disambiguation)
 Passer (disambiguation)
 Passing (disambiguation)
 Success (concept)